Sychdyn or Soughton (meaning South Town) is a village in Flintshire, Wales. It is situated on the A5119 road, and is just over 1000 yards (1 km) north of the county town of Mold.

In 1086, the village was listed in Domesday Book as a small settlement situated within the hundred of Ati's Cross and the county of Cheshire.  However, it was back under Welsh control by the following century, and Llywelyn ap Gruffudd is on record as having visited in the late thirteenth century.

Sychdyn, which is surrounded by farmland and undisturbed woodland, is today a commuter village with residents working in nearby Chester, Wrexham, Liverpool or Manchester. The village contains the 'Cross Keys Pub' public house, a convenience store, Bryn Seion Chapel (now sold and no longer a Chapel), horse riding school, and a primary school, Sychdyn County Primary.

Soughton Hall is a large country mansion-turned-hotel situated on the northern outskirts of the village. Notable guests that have stayed here include Luciano Pavarotti, Michael Jackson, King Juan Carlos I of Spain and Richard Burton. Lower Soughton Hall is situated about 1 mile (1.5 km) to the north of Soughton Hall, and is currently owned by the footballer Michael Owen.

Sychdyn Memorial Hall is the home to many different societies including the Youth Club and Red Dragon Lans. The hall can be hired out for special occasions. Sychdyn also has a bowling green, football pitch and all-weather pitch, which can be booked for games and matches. The bowling green is entered via a War Memorial Arch, which was erected to those who died serving in the First World War.

Sychdyn Carnival takes place each year to raise funds to maintain and upkeep the village playground, this is held on the main playing field, where the Rose Queen is crowned after the carnival procession's annual parade through the village.

Sychdyn has a football team which currently plays in the Clwyd League East Championship Division, playing their home games at Northop Hall Pavilion. It is currently managed by Rhys Edwards.

Soughton is the traditional name for the village in English, however Sychdyn is the name used by Flintshire County Council (sanctioned since 1954), Northop Community Council, the BBC, local media (depending on publication usage is mixed), Ordinance Survey and the  Welsh Language Commissioner.

References

External links

 Soughton War Memorial at FlintshireWarMemorials.com

Villages in Flintshire